Khao Yoi railway station is a railway station located in Khao Yoi Subdistrict, Khao Yoi District, Phetchaburi.

Services 
 Ordinary 251/252 Bang Sue Junction-Prachuap Khiri Khan-Bang Sue Junction
 Ordinary 254 Lang Suan-Thon Buri

References 
 
 

Railway stations in Thailand
Phetchaburi province